Anthony Rogie (born 2 June 1991) is a French professional footballer who plays for Championnat National club Sedan as a midfielder.

Professional career
A youth academy member of RC Lens, made his professional debut for Lens in a Ligue 2 1–0 win over Chamois Niortais on 5 October 2012. He transferred to Quevilly-Rouen and helped them to two successive promotions, signing his a pro contract in 2017 when they reached the Ligue 2.

On 11 June 2021, he joined Sedan in Championnat National.

References

External links
 QRM Profile
 RC Lens Profile
 
 
 
 

Living people
1991 births
People from Douai
French footballers
RC Lens players
US Quevilly-Rouen Métropole players
FC Rouen players
CS Sedan Ardennes players
Championnat National players
Championnat National 2 players
Championnat National 3 players
Ligue 2 players
Association football midfielders
Sportspeople from Nord (French department)
Footballers from Hauts-de-France